Smell of Female is the first live album by the American rock band the Cramps. The mini-album was recorded at The Peppermint Lounge in New York City on February 25–26, 1983, and issued the same year on Big Beat Records in the UK, Enigma Records in the US and New Rose Records in France. It was also released by New Rose as a quadruple-7" box set, with an additional track, "Weekend on Mars". It was later expanded to album length with three bonus tracks.

Track listing

Personnel

The Cramps
 Lux Interior – vocals, harmonica, percussion
 Poison Ivy Rorschach – lead guitar, bass
 Kid Congo Powers – guitar
 Nick Knox – drums

Technical
 Paul McKenna – engineer
 Eddy Schreyer – mastering
 Da Lux – cover

References

The Cramps albums
1983 live albums
I.R.S. Records live albums